A Virginia Historic Landmark is a structure, site, or place designated as a landmark by the Virginia Department of Historic Resources.

Inclusion process
Nominations for the Virginia Landmark Register are simultaneously processed for inclusion on the National Register for Historic Places. Both registries were formed in 1966. 

There are two parts to the selection process for designating landmarks: 
 evaluation and nomination with the latter contingent on passing the evaluation stage.  
 upon accepting the nomination for the state level landmark status, the State Review Board makes a recommendation on whether the State Historic Preservation Officer should submit it to the Keeper of the National Register of Historic Places in Washington, D.C.

Historic sites

The following is a partial list of the sites designated as Virginia Historic Landmarks, on the Virginia Landmarks Register:

Ball-Sellers House 
Fairfield Plantation
Monterey Hotel
Michie Tavern
Natural Bridge
Pamplin Historical Park and National Museum of the Civil War Soldier 
Ramsay
Seay's Chapel Methodist Church
Sherwood Forest Plantation

See also
Virginia Landmarks Register
List of National Historic Landmarks in Virginia
National Register of Historic Places listings in Virginia

References

External links
  Dhr.virginia.gov: official Virginia Department of Historic Resources — Virginia Historic Landmarks website — homepage.
  Dhr.virginia.gov: official Listings of Virginia Landmarks Register & National Register of Historic Places by City or County — search-engine with links.
 Virginia.org: Historic Sites
 Dhr.virginia.gov: Master List of Virginia Historic Landmarks + National Register of Historic Places in Virginia — alphabetical flat list, updated through March 2014